Culpeper station is a train station in Culpeper, Virginia. It was originally built by the Chesapeake and Ohio Railroad in 1904, replacing an 1874 station house which itself replaced two stations originally built by the Orange and Alexandria Railroad. It is currently served by Amtrak's Cardinal and Crescent routes, along with two daily Northeast Regional trains to and from Lynchburg.

When then-owner Norfolk Southern Railway tried to demolish a portion of the depot in 1985, a citizens' committee formed to save the building. In 1995, the town successfully prepared a $700,000 renovation grant under the Virginia Department of Transportation Enhancement Program. Three years later, Norfolk Southern sold the depot to the town, and in 2000 the renovated building opened to the public. Additional work to the freight section was completed in 2003.

References

External links

Culpeper Amtrak Station (USA RailGuide -- TrainWeb)

Buildings and structures in Culpeper County, Virginia
Amtrak stations in Virginia
Former Chesapeake and Ohio Railway stations
Transportation in Culpeper County, Virginia
Railway stations in the United States opened in 1904